The 1994–95 Sunshine Hockey League season was the third season of the Sunshine Hockey League, a North American minor pro league. Five teams participated in the league, and the West Palm Beach Blaze won the Sunshine Cup for the third consecutive year.

Regular season

Sunshine Cup-Playoffs

External links
 Season 1994/95 on hockeydb.com

Sunshine Hockey League seasons
Sun